Guard That Girl is a 1935 American mystery film written and directed by Lambert Hillyer, which stars Robert Allen, Florence Rice, and Ward Bond.

Cast list
 Robert Allen as Larry Donovan
 Florence Rice as Helen Bradford
 Ward Bond as Budge Edwards
 Wyrley Birch as Mr. Scranton
 Barbara Kent as Jeanne Martin
 Arthur Hohl as Reynolds
 Elizabeth Risdon as Aunt Catherine
 Nana Bryant as Sarah
 Thurston Hall as Dr. Silas Hudson
 Bert Roach as Ellwood
 Lobo the dog as Benjy's police dog

References

External links
 
 
 

Columbia Pictures films
Films directed by Lambert Hillyer
1930s comedy mystery films
American comedy mystery films
American black-and-white films
American action comedy films
1930s action comedy films
1935 comedy films
1935 films
1930s American films